Maeklong or Meklong may refer to:
 Mae Klong, a river in Thailand
Samut Songkhram, a city in Thailand
 Maeklong Railway, a railway connecting the city to Bangkok
 HTMS Maeklong, a Royal Thai Navy ship
 Meklong, a ship formerly owned by Pacific Shipowners Ltd.